Slough Town Football Club is a semi-professional English  football club based in Slough, Berkshire. Nicknamed "The Rebels", the team competes in the National League South, at the sixth tier of English football, following promotion from the Southern League at the end of the 2017–18 season.

History
The history of the club began in 1890 when three teams Swifts, Slough Albion and Young Men's Friendly Society formed a new club, Slough F.C., between them. The team initially played in the Southern Alliance alongside the likes of Tottenham Hotspur and Windsor & Eton before later moving on to the Great Western Suburban League. In 1921, it attempted to join the Isthmian League but lost out to Wycombe Wanderers in the voting. Instead Slough chose to join the Spartan League.

In 1936, the owners of the club's ground, The Dolphin Stadium, sold up to a greyhound racing consortium, which ordered the football club to vacate the stadium three years later. After being forced to groundshare with Maidenhead United for several years, the club agreed to a merge with Slough Centre F.C. to return to a ground in their home town. The new club took the name Slough United F.C.

After The Second World War Slough Utd was reluctant to rejoin the Spartan League and led a breakaway movement to form a new league, which became the Corinthian League. It was from this that the club derived its nickname of "The Rebels". Shortly after this the two clubs which had merged to form Slough United separated once again, with the former Slough F.C. continuing under the new name of Slough Town F.C.

Slough Town won the Corinthian League in 1950–51 but in 1964 the league folded and Slough, along with many other former Corinthian clubs, joined an expanded Athenian League. The Rebels were champions of this league on three occasions, with the third win earning promotion to the Isthmian League in 1973. During the 1980s, they were league champions on two occasions, the second of which brought promotion to the Football Conference. Slough lasted four seasons at this level, were relegated back to the Isthmian League, bounced back at the first attempt, and then played three more seasons of Conference football. In 1998, the consortium which had bought the club out of receivership seven years earlier decided that they were not prepared to pay for ground improvements required to remain in the Conference, and so the club was demoted back to the Isthmian League despite having finished in 8th place.

Further relegation to the Isthmian League Division One followed in 2000–01 but the club regained its Premier Division status in 2003–04 and remained there until the end of the 2006–07 season, when they finished bottom and conceded over 120 goals. In the 2004–05 season, Slough knocked Walsall of Football League One out of the FA Cup. Highlights of the game were shown on Match of the Day, though because of the team sharing the Stag Meadow ground at the time, the programme showed overhead shots of Windsor instead of Slough when introducing the rarely featured team. Slough transferred over to the Southern Football League Division One South & West for the 2007–08 season, where they finished 21st out of 22 teams. Although initially relegated (for the second year running), they were one of the teams given a provisional reprieve after Halifax Town went into administration.

In the season of 2004–05, Slough Town beat Walsall to reach the 2nd round of the FA Cup however they then lost to Yeading. Slough Town were also the Isthmian League Cup winners in 2004–05 after they beat Hampton & Richmond Borough 3–1 in the final with 2 goals from Ian Hodges and 1 from Josias Carbon to help them secure the win and the silverware.

Over the next two seasons, and now playing in the Southern Football League Division One Midlands, Slough's performance continued to improve. In the 2009–10 season, Slough Town finish 5th in the table, qualifying the team for the promotion play-off matches. Having beaten second-placed Hitchin Town 2–1 in the play-off semi-final, Slough lost 4–0 to Chesham United in the final, meaning they had to remain in the same division for the 2010–11 season. Once again they finished 5th in the 2010–11 season, but lost to Hitchin Town in the play-off semi-final 4–1.

Having come close to promotion to the Premier Division in the last few seasons, including two play-off final defeats, Slough parted company with manager Steve Bateman following the 2012–13 season after four years at the helm, the last of which saw them miss out on the play-offs by a solitary point. The club looked to take a new direction in 2013–14 and appointed Neil Baker and Jon Underwood, the management duo who had taken league rivals Godalming Town to the play-offs in the previous season. With Godalming forced to relocate to the South & West Division following their failure to win the play-offs, the majority of their squad decided to follow Baker and Underwood to Slough. In their very first season, the new management team steered the club to promotion via the play-offs. Slough claimed a 3–0 victory at Rugby Town in the semi-final before winning the play-off final against Kettering Town in front of 2,331 at Kettering's home of Latimer Park on 5 May 2014. Slough trailed 0–2 at half-time before staging a second half comeback.  Two goals from Johnnie Dyer brought the Rebels level before James McClurg scored the goal that ultimately returned Slough Town to the third tier of non-league football after several years away.

The 2017–18 season was one of their best for many years. In December, they reached the second round of the FA Cup against Rochdale at home. The game was televised by BT Sport and Slough lost 4–0. With records broken for points attained and goals scored they went on to finish 3rd in the league. Slough were in play off action again. After a home 3–1 win against Kettering Town, they played away to King's Lynn Town in the final. By virtue of an 89th-minute winner from Manny Williams, they won 2–1 and thus secured promotion to the National League South for the forthcoming season.

Ground

Slough Town started the 2016–17 season playing their early home games at Holloways Park, Windsor Road, Beaconsfield, Buckinghamshire. They moved back into the borough of Slough for the first time in over a decade on 29 August 2016 when they played their first game at the new ground, Arbour Park, against Hayes and Yeading United, winning 2–1.

The pitch at Arbour Park is 3G and has been approved by FIFA, one of only 24 to be so in the UK.

For many years since the 1930s, Slough Town played at the Dolphin Stadium, just to the east of the town centre. From 1973 Slough Town played at the Wexham Park Stadium. At the end of the 2002–03 season, financial disagreements with the stadium's owners led to the club's eviction. The Stadium is still in existence, but has since fallen into a state of serious disrepair.  During the next four seasons (2003–04 to 2006–07) the club was based in Windsor, ground-sharing with Windsor & Eton at their Stag Meadow ground.  In the summer of 2007, the club agreed a three-year ground-share with Beaconsfield SYCOB. This was extended to cover the 2010–11 season, and continued until Slough moved into their new ground, Arbour Park, on 29 August 2016.

In June 2009, Slough Town made a proposal that was submitted to Slough Borough Council for permission to build a new stadium within the Borough of Slough. The proposed location for the development was the Arbour Vale school site on Stoke Road, to the north of the town. In addition to a state-of-the-art stadium, the plans included affordable housing and sports fields. An artist's impression of the new ground was released in March 2012. In 2018, after opening two years prior, Arbour Park hosted a number of games in the 2018 CONIFA World Football Cup.

Players

Current squad
As of 15 March 2023

Out on loan

Club staff

Club records
Record league win: 17–0 v Railway Clearing House, 4 March 1922
Record cup win: 16–0 v Wolverton, 7 December 1935
Record league defeat: 9–0 v Aylesbury United, 20 April 1929 and 9–0 v AFC Wimbledon, Saturday, 31 March 2007
Record cup defeat: 11–1 v Chesham Town 5 February 1910
Record transfer fee paid: £18,000 for Colin Fielder from Farnborough Town in 1991
Record transfer fee received: £25,000 for Lloyd Owusu from Brentford in 1998
Best Berks & Bucks Senior Cup run: Winners 11 times (1902–03, 1919–20, 1923–24, 1926–27, 1935–36, 1954–55, 1970–71, 1971–72, 1976–77, 1980–81, 2018–19)
Best FA Cup run: Second round proper 8 times (1970–71, 1979–80, 1982–83, 1985–86, 1986–87, 2004–05, 2017–18 and 2018–19)
Best FA Trophy run: Semi-finalists (1976–77 and 1997–98)
Best FA Amateur Cup run: Finalists  (1972–73)

Former players

Sources

References

External links

Official site
Official Slough Town FC website

Unofficial sites
RebelsOnline – An Independent Slough Town FC website
Slough Town Soapbox – Matchday Programme feature articles
HorshamRebel – Slough Town Match Photo website

 
Football clubs in England
Southern Football League clubs
Sport in Slough
Association football clubs established in 1890
Isthmian League
Corinthian League (football)
Athenian League
Football clubs in Berkshire
1890 establishments in England
National League (English football) clubs
Great Western Suburban League